Timber Mountain is a peak of the San Gabriel Mountains, located in the Cucamonga Wilderness, Angeles National Forest, San Bernardino County, California.

History
Originally named Chapman Mountain, the peak was renamed Timber Mountain in the mid-20th century.

Climbing
Hikers commonly reach Timber Mountain via the Three T's Trail; it can be approached from the south (via Icehouse Canyon and Icehouse Saddle) or the north (via Telegraph Peak and Thunder Mountain).

References

San Gabriel Mountains
Mountains of San Bernardino County, California
Angeles National Forest
Mountains of Southern California